Waiting for "Superman" is a 2010 American documentary film written and directed by Davis Guggenheim and produced by Lesley Chilcott. The film criticizes the American public education system by following several students as they strive to be accepted into competitive charter schools such as KIPP LA Schools, Harlem Success Academy and Summit Preparatory Charter High School.

Synopsis
Geoffrey Canada describes his journey as an educator and recounts the story of his devastation when, as a child, he discovers that Superman is fictional, that "there is no one coming with enough power to save us."

Throughout the documentary, different aspects of the American public education system are examined. Things such as the ease in which a public school teacher achieves tenure, the inability to fire a teacher who is tenured, and how the system attempts to reprimand poorly performing teachers are shown to affect the educational environment. Teaching standards are called into question as there is often conflicting bureaucracy between teaching expectations at the school, state, or federal level.

The film also examines teacher's unions. Michelle Rhee, the former chancellor of the Washington, D.C. public schools (the district with some of the worst-performing students at the time), is shown attempting to take on the union agreements that teachers are bound to, but suffers a backlash from the unions and the teachers themselves.

Statistical comparisons are made between the different types of primary or secondary educational institutions available: state school, private school, and charter school. There are also comparisons made between schools in affluent neighborhoods versus schools in poorer ones. Since charter schools do not operate with the same restrictions as public institutions, they are depicted as having a more experimental approach to educating students.

Since many charter schools are not large enough to accept all of their applicants, the selection of students is done by lottery. The film follows several families as they attempt to gain access to prominent charter schools for their children.

Details

Cast
 Geoffrey Canada
 The Esparza Family
 The Hill Family
 The Jones Family
 The Black Family
 Michelle Rhee
 Bill Strickland
 Randi Weingarten
 Eric Hanushek
 The Zell Family

Release
Waiting for "Superman" premiered in the US on September 24, 2010, in theaters in New York and Los Angeles, with a rolling wider release that began on October 1, 2010. During its opening weekend in New York City and Los Angeles, the film grossed $141,000 in four theaters, averaging $35,250 per theater.

Reception
The film has earned both praise and negative criticism from commentators, reformers, and educators. On Rotten Tomatoes the film has a "Certified Fresh" approval rating of 90% based on reviews from 118 critics. The site's consensus states: "Gripping, heartbreaking, and ultimately hopeful, Waiting for "Superman" is an impassioned indictment of the American school system from An Inconvenient Truth director Davis Guggenheim." On Metacritic it has a score of 81% based on reviews from 31 critics, indicating "universal acclaim".

Roger Ebert gave the film 3.5 stars out of 4 and wrote, "What struck me most of all was Geoffrey Canada's confidence that a charter school run on his model can make virtually any first-grader a high school graduate who's accepted to college. A good education, therefore, is not ruled out by poverty, uneducated parents or crime – and drug-infested neighborhoods. In fact, those are the very areas where he has success." Scott Bowles of USA Today lauded the film for its focus on the students: "it's hard to deny the power of Guggenheim's lingering shots on these children." Joe Morgenstern, writing for The Wall Street Journal, gave the film a positive review writing, "when the future of public education is being debated with unprecedented intensity," the film "makes an invaluable addition to the debate." Lisa Schwarzbaum of Entertainment Weekly gave the film an A−, calling it "powerful, passionate, and potentially revolution-inducing." The Hollywood Reporter focused on Geoffrey Canada's performance as "both the most inspiring and a consistently entertaining speaker," while also noting it "isn't exhaustive in its critique." Variety characterized the film's production quality as "deserving every superlative" and felt that "the film is never less than buoyant, thanks largely to the dedicated and effective teachers on whom Guggenheim focuses." Geraldo Rivera praised the film for promoting discussion of educational issues. Deborah Kenny, CEO and founder of the Harlem Village Academies, made positive reference to the film in a The Wall Street Journal op-ed piece about education reform.

The film has also garnered praise from a number of conservative critics. The Wall Street Journal William McGurn praised the film in an op-ed piece, calling it a "stunning liberal exposé of a system that consigns American children who most need a decent education to our most destructive public schools." Kyle Smith, for the New York Post, gave the film 4.5 stars, calling it an "invaluable learning experience." Forbes Melik Kaylan similarly liked the film, writing, "I urge you all to drop everything and go see the documentary Waiting For "Superman" at the earliest opportunity."

The film also received negative criticism. Andrew O'Hehir of Salon wrote a negative review of the film, writing that while there's "a great deal that's appealing," there's also "as much in this movie that is downright baffling." Melissa Anderson of The Village Voice was critical of the film for not including enough details of outlying socioeconomic issues, writing, "macroeconomic responses to Guggenheim's query…go unaddressed in Waiting for "Superman," which points out the vast disparity in resources for inner-city versus suburban schools only to ignore them." Anderson also opined that the animation clips were overused. In New York City, a group of local teachers protested one of the documentary's showings, calling the film "complete nonsense", writing that "there is no teacher voice in the film."

Accolades

Educational reception and allegations of inaccuracy

Author and academic Rick Ayers lambasted the accuracy of the film, describing it as "a slick marketing piece full of half-truths and distortions" and criticizing its focus on standardized testing. In Ayers' view, the "corporate powerhouses and the ideological opponents of all things public" have employed the film to "break the teacher's unions and to privatize education," while driving teachers' wages even lower and running "schools like little corporations." Lastly, Ayers writes that "schools are more segregated today than before Brown v. Board of Education in 1954," and thus criticized the film for not mentioning that "black and brown students are being suspended, expelled, searched, and criminalized."

Diane Ravitch, Research Professor of Education at New York University and a nonresident senior fellow at the Brookings Institution, similarly criticizes the film's lack of accuracy. The most substantial distortion in the film, according to Ravitch, is the film's claim that "70 percent of eighth-grade students cannot read at grade level," a misrepresentation of data from the National Assessment of Educational Progress. Ravitch served as a board member with the NAEP and says that "the NAEP doesn't measure performance in terms of grade-level achievement," as claimed in the film, but only as "advanced," "proficient," and "basic." The film assumes that any student below proficient is "below grade level," but this claim is not supported by the NAEP data. Ravitch says that a study by Stanford University economist Margaret Raymond of 5000 charter schools found that only 17% are superior in math test performance to a matched public school, and many perform badly, casting doubt on the film's claim that privately managed charter schools are the solution to bad public schools. (The film says, however, that it is focusing on the one in five superior charter schools, or close to 17%, that do outperform public schools.) One of the reasons for the high test scores, writes Ravitch, is that many charter schools expel low-performing students to bring up their average scores. Ravitch also writes that many charter schools are involved in "unsavory real estate deals" 

In 2011, many news media reported on a testing score "cheating scandal" at Rhee's schools, because the test answer sheets contained a suspiciously high number of erasures that changed wrong answers to right answers. They asked Rhee whether the pressure on teachers led them to cheat. Rhee said that only a small number of teachers and principals cheated. Ravitch said that "cheating, teaching to bad tests, institutionalized fraud, dumbing down of tests, and a narrowed curriculum" were the true outcomes of Rhee's tenure in D.C. schools.

A teacher-backed group called the Grassroots Education Movement produced a rebuttal documentary titled The Inconvenient Truth Behind Waiting for Superman, which was released in 2011. It criticizes some public figures featured in Waiting for "Superman", proposes different policies to improve education in the United States and counters the position taken by Guggenheim. The documentary was directed, filmed, and edited by Julie Cavanagh, Darren Marelli, Norm Scott, Mollie Bruhn, and Lisa Donlan.

Book release
There is also a companion book titled Waiting For "Superman": How We Can Save America's Failing Public Schools.

See also

 Chalk (film)
 The Cartel
 Charter school
 District of Columbia Public Schools
 Education in the United States
 Harlem Children's Zone
 Knowledge Is Power Program
 Magnet school
 SEED Foundation
 The Lottery (2010 film)
 Bill Gates

References

External links
 
 
 
 Critics Say Documentary Unfairly Targets Teachers Unions and Promotes Charter Schools – video report by Democracy Now!

2010 films
2010 documentary films
American documentary films
Documentary films about American politics
Documentary films about children
Documentary films about education in the United States
Documentary films about education
2010s English-language films
Films directed by Davis Guggenheim
Sundance Film Festival award winners
Films scored by Christophe Beck
Participant (company) films
Walden Media films
2010s American films